Das Interessante Blatt was an Austrian magazine which appeared weekly from 1882 to 1939. A supplement of the newspaper appeared under the title the Wiener Bilder, their successor newspaper was the Wiener Illustrierte.

Bibliography 
 Helmut W. Lang (editor): Österreichische Retrospektive Bibliographie (ORBI). Reihe 2: Österreichische Zeitungen 1492–1945. Volume 2: Helmut W. Lang, Ladislaus Lang, Wilma Buchinger: Bibliographie der österreichischen Zeitungen 1621–1945. A–M. Bearbeitet an der Österreichischen Nationalbibliothek. K. G. Saur, Munich 2003,

References

External links
 
 Das interessante Blatt on ZVAB

Defunct magazines published in Austria
German-language magazines
Magazines established in 1882
Magazines disestablished in 1939
Magazines published in Vienna
Weekly magazines published in Austria